In statics and structural mechanics, a structure is statically indeterminate when the static equilibrium equations force and moment equilibrium conditions are insufficient for determining the internal forces and reactions on that structure.

Mathematics 

Based on Newton's laws of motion, the equilibrium equations available for a two-dimensional body are:

 the vectorial sum of the forces acting on the body equals zero. This translates to:
 the sum of the horizontal components of the forces equals zero;
 the sum of the vertical components of forces equals zero;
 the sum of the moments (about an arbitrary point) of all forces equals zero.

The equilibrium equations are:

 

Since there are four unknown forces (or variables) (and ) but only three equilibrium equations, this system of simultaneous equations does not have a unique solution. The structure is therefore classified as statically indeterminate. 

To solve statically indeterminate systems (determine the various moment and force reactions within it), one considers the material properties and compatibility in deformations.

Statically determinate
Note that the system is completely constrained here.
The system becomes an exact constraint kinematic coupling.
The solution to the problem is:

In order to distinguish between this and the situation when a system under equilibrium is perturbed and becomes unstable, it is preferable to use the phrase partly constrained here. In this case, the two unknowns  and  can be determined by resolving the vertical force equation and the moment equation simultaneously. The solution yields the same results as previously obtained. However, it is not possible to satisfy the horizontal force equation unless .

Statical determinacy 
Descriptively, a statically determinate structure can be defined as a structure where, if it is possible to find internal actions in equilibrium with external loads, those internal actions are unique. The structure has no possible states of self-stress, i.e. internal forces in equilibrium with zero external loads are not possible. Statical indeterminacy, however, is the existence of a non-trivial (non-zero) solution to the homogeneous system of equilibrium equations. It indicates the possibility of self-stress (stress in the absence of an external load) that may be induced by mechanical or thermal action.

Mathematically, this requires a stiffness matrix to have full rank.

A statically indeterminate structure can only be analyzed by including further information like material properties and deflections. Numerically, this can be achieved by using methods like matrix structural analyses and finite element analyses.

Practically, a structure is called 'statically overdetermined' when it comprises more mechanical constraints like walls, columns or bolts than absolutely necessary for stability.

See also
Christian Otto Mohr
Flexibility method
Moment distribution method
Overconstrained mechanism
Structural engineering
Kinematic determinacy

References

External links
 Beam calculation online (Statically indeterminate)

Statics
Structural analysis